Pacelli Catholic Schools is a private, Roman Catholic PreK-12th grade school system with year round child care in Austin, Minnesota.  It is located in the Roman Catholic Diocese of Winona.

Background
Pacelli is the only Catholic school system in Mower County, Minnesota offering all day child care, preschool, all day every day kindergarten, and a PreK-12th grade educational experience.

Athletics
Pacelli is a member of the Minnesota State High School League and participates in a wide variety of sports and activities. Pacelli and Lyle Co-op for many sports including Volleyball, Basketball, Golf, Softball, Track, Baseball, and Football.
Pacelli and Austin High Co-op for Boys Soccer, Boys Hockey, Boys Tennis, and Wrestling.
Cross Country, Girls Tennis, and Cheerleading are Pacelli sports that do not Co-op with other teams. Because Pacelli is a small school, almost all of the students are involved in at least one sport or other extracurricular activity.

Faith
The education offered through the Pacelli Catholic Schools is a flexible program that integrates the academic, cultural, physical, and spiritual development of its students. Students attend mass one day per week at St. Augustine's Church, and many theology courses are available. Although it is a Catholic school, Pacelli accepts students of many different religious backgrounds.

Notes and references

External links
 School Website

Roman Catholic Diocese of Winona-Rochester
Catholic secondary schools in Minnesota
Schools in Mower County, Minnesota
Educational institutions established in 1913
1913 establishments in Minnesota
Buildings and structures in Austin, Minnesota